The Big Cat is a popular nickname in professional sports. It may refer to:
Johnny Lee Bench (born 1941),Oklahoma, baseball player
Andrés Galarraga (born 1961), Venezuelan baseball player
Ernie Ladd (1938–2007), American wrestler and football player
Leon Lett (born 1968), American football player
Earl Lloyd (1928–2015), American basketball player
Jamaal Magloire (born 1978), Canadian basketball player
Miloslav Mečíř (born 1964), Slovak tennis player
Johnny Mize (1913–1993), American baseball player
James Williams (offensive lineman) (born 1968), American football player
Cleveland Williams (1933–1999), American professional boxer 
Rayfield Wright (1945–2022), American football player
Andrei Vasilevskiy (born 1994), Russian ice hockey player

Entertainment
The Big Cat (film), a 1949 film directed by Phil Karlson

See also
Big cat (disambiguation)
The Cat (disambiguation)
Big the Cat, a character in the Sonic the Hedgehog video games